Nemanja Nikolić (born 31 December 1987) is a professional footballer who plays as a striker for AEK Larnaca and Hungary national team.

Born in Serbia, but never selected for the Serbian national team, he chose to represent the Hungary national team instead.

Early life
Nikolić was born in Senta, Yugoslavia to a Serbian father and a Hungarian mother. He began his career with his brother at Senta.

Club career

Kaposvár
On 7 February 2008, Nikolić was signed by Kaposvár. He played his first match against Videoton. He managed to score thirty goals in just 49 matches therefore many top Hungarian sides wanted to sign him such as Újpest, Ferencváros and Videoton.

Videoton
In 2010 Videoton signed Nikolić. He became top scorer in the 2009–10 season of the Hungarian League.

Nikolić won the 2010–11 season of the Hungarian League with Videoton. With the arrival of the Portuguese coach Paulo Sousa he was often left out from the first squad in the early matches of the 2011–12 season of the Hungarian League. However, as a substitute he managed to score against Paks, Siófok (twice), Újpest (twice) and Pápa in a row in the Hungarian League.

On 2 August 2012, Nikolić scored the only goal of the first leg of the third round of the 2012–13 UEFA Europa League season, when Videoton beat the Belgian K.A.A. Gent 1–0 at the Sóstói Stadion. He also scored in the second leg of the tie which was won by 3–0 by Videoton at the Jules Ottenstadion. On 4 September 2012, he scored a goal in the 2012–13 UEFA Europa League season when Videoton beat Portugal's Sporting CP 3–0 at Stadion Sóstói.

On 26 October 2014, Nikolić set a new record scoring in 12 consecutive league matches in the 2014–15 season.

Legia Warsaw
On 8 June 2015, Nikolić joined Ekstraklasa club, Legia Warsaw. On 19 July 2015, Nikolić debuted in the 2015–16 season of the Ekstraklasa by scoring two goals against Śląsk Wrocław at the Stadion Miejski, Wrocław. On 16 March 2016 Nikolic scored a hat-trick against Zawisza Bydgoszcz at the Pepsi Arena, Warsaw. The match ended with a 4–0 win for Legia Warsaw. On 15 May 2016 Legia became champions of the 2015–16 Ekstraklasa season by beating Pogoń Szczecin 3–0 at home. He was the top scorer of the 2015–16 Ekstraklasa season, scoring 28 goals in 37 matches.

Chicago Fire

Nikolić joined the Chicago Fire as a Designated Player for a reported transfer fee of $3 million from Legia Warsaw on 20 December 2016 on a three-year deal worth reportedly $1.9 million per year, per MLS Players Union documents.

Speaking on the transfer, in a press release by the club, Fire GM Nelson Rodriguez stated "Through this transfer, we have secured a champion in his prime, and one of the most prolific goal scorers in Europe over the last few years".

Fire coach Veljko Paunović noted his awareness of Nikolić from an early age from his time in Serbia. In an article published by the Fire Paunović praised Nikolić's skillset:

"His quality is scoring goals and assisting, but then he's a man that can participate in both phases of team play," Paunovic said. "He's very good in all phases of the game. Defensively, he helps the team to recover the ball as soon as possible in order that we can control the game and create opportunities for our team to win. Sometimes he will benefit from team play and he will be just the executor, but sometimes he's capable of creating his own situations in the game, the opportunities 1v1, and scoring his own goals."

2017 season
Nikolić's high career strike-rate continued with the Fire, where he became an instant success - leading the league in scoring and acquiring numerous accolades through the first half of the season, and ultimately winning the 2017 MLS Golden Boot. His first goal for the club came in the Fire's 2017 home opener against Real Salt Lake, in which he scored an unassisted effort in the 11th minute.

Nikolić was named to the MLS Team of the Week in week 7 alongside fellow Fire forward Luis Solignac. He was additionally selected as MLS player of the week in week 7.

He was once again chosen for team of the week in week 11 for his brace in Chicago's 4–1 win against the reigning MLS Cup champion Seattle Sounders.

With 10 goals through the first 11 games of the season, Nikolić led the league in scoring. With his brace against the Colorado Rapids on 16 May, he became the first Fire player to score in four straight games since Mike Magee in 2013. This brace once again earned him MLS Team of the Week honors.

After week 15 Nikolić continued to lead the league in scoring, with 12 goals in 15 games. He was named to the week 15 Team of the Week for his goal against Atlanta United in Chicago's 2–0 home win alongside Fire players Bastian Schweinsteiger, David Accam, and João Meira.

He was named MLS Player of the Month for May for his six goals and one assist during the Fire's undefeated run during the stretch.

A week after Fire teammate David Accam was named player of the week for week 17 for his hat-trick against Orlando City SC, Nikolić earned the same honor on 3 July for his brace against the Vancouver Whitecaps. It was the second time he won the award (the first time in week 7 as noted above). After week 18 Nikolić continued to lead the MLS Golden Boot race with 16 goals in 18 matches.

Alongside Bastian Schweinsteiger Nikolić was named to the "2017 MLS All-Star Fan XI". Nikolic finished the 2017 season as the Golden Boot winner with 24 goals and 4 assists.

2018 season
Nikolić finished the 2018 season as the Fire's top scorer, finishing seventh in scoring league-wide, with 15 goals and 2 assists.

Fehérvár
In February 2020, Nikolić left the Fire on the expiry of his contract and returned to Hungary and former club Videoton now known as Fehérvár. Nikolić was given the number 71 shirt upon his return.

International career
On 11 October 2013, Nikolić debuted in the Hungary national team against the Netherlands in an 8–1 defeat at the Amsterdam Arena in the 2014 FIFA World Cup qualification. On 14 October 2013, Nikolić scored his first goal in the national team against Andorra in the 51st minute. His second goal was recorded as an own goal by Lima.

On 18 November 2014, Nikolić scored against Russia in a 2–1 defeat in a friendly match at the Groupama Arena, Budapest, Hungary.

Nikolić was called up to Hungary's squad for UEFA Euro 2016. On 18 June 2016, he played in a 1–1 draw against Iceland at the Stade Vélodrome, Marseille in which his run and far post drive was re-directed in by Iceland for the last minute equalizer.

On 3 May 2018, Nikolić announced his retirement from the national team. But this situation has been changed when he agreed with Marco Rossi on his return.

On 1 June 2021, Nikolić was included in the final 26-man squad to represent Hungary at the rescheduled UEFA Euro 2020 tournament.

Career statistics

Club

International

Scores and results list Hungary's goal tally first, score column indicates score after each Nikolić goal.

Honours

Club
Videoton
 Nemzeti Bajnokság I: 2010–11, 2014–15
 Hungarian League Cup: 2011–12
 Hungarian Super Cup: 2011, 2012

Legia Warsaw
 Ekstraklasa: 2015–16, 2016–17
 Polish Cup: 2015–16

Individual

 Hungarian League Top scorer: 2009–10 (18 goals), 2013–14 (18 goals; shared with Attila Simon), 2014–15 (21 goals)
 Ekstraklasa Top scorer: 2015–16 (28 goals)
 Polish Cup Top scorer: 2015–16 (6 goals)
 Ekstraklasa Player of the Month: August 2015, September 2015, October 2015
 Ekstraklasa Best Forward: 2015–16
 Ekstraklasa Best Player: 2015–16
 Ekstraklasa Canal + Spectator Prize: 2015–16
 MLS Golden Boot: 2017 (24 goals)
 MLS Best XI: 2017
 2017 Hungarian Player of the Year (M4 Sport Gála)
 Best MLS Player ESPY Award: 2018

Personal life
On 28 January 2011, Nikolić obtained Hungarian citizenship. András Cser-Palkovics, mayor of Székesfehérvár said that "We know about him that he knows the country, speaks the language since he has big plans with Videoton this year". Nikolić said that "I knew that it is not easy to obtain Hungarian citizenship but I hoped that due to the fact that my mother is Hungarian it would be easier but it turned out to be a bit more difficult."

References

External links

 Nemanja Nikolić profile at magyarfutball.hu
 Profile 
 
 

1987 births
Living people
People from Senta
Association football forwards
Hungarian footballers
Hungary international footballers
Naturalized citizens of Hungary
Serbian footballers
Hungarian people of Serbian descent
Serbian people of Hungarian descent
FK Senta players
Barcsi SC footballers
Kaposvölgye VSC footballers
Kaposvári Rákóczi FC players
Fehérvár FC players
Legia Warsaw players
Chicago Fire FC players
Nemzeti Bajnokság I players
Nemzeti Bajnokság II players
Ekstraklasa players
Major League Soccer players
Designated Players (MLS)
Major League Soccer All-Stars
UEFA Euro 2016 players
UEFA Euro 2020 players
Hungarian expatriate footballers
Hungarian expatriate sportspeople in Poland
Expatriate footballers in Poland
Hungarian expatriate sportspeople in the United States
Expatriate soccer players in the United States